Getúlio Vargas (1882-1954) was a Brazilian politician who served as the 14th and 17th President of Brazil.

Getúlio Vargas may also refer to:

 Getúlio Vargas (footballer) (born 1983), Brazilian footballer
 Getúlio Vargas, Rio Grande do Sul, a municipality in  Rio Grande do Sul, Brazil
 Fundação Getulio Vargas, a Brazilian higher education institution